The Briton's Protection is a historic, Grade II listed public house in Manchester, England.  Various dates are given for its establishment; the pub's own website says 1806, although its bicentenary was not celebrated until 2011. In any case, it was listed in Pigot and Dean's New Directory of Manchester & Salford for 1821 and 1822.

The pub's name recalls its use as an army recruiting venue. A set of murals inside the pub commemorates the Peterloo Massacre.

The brick building, with a slate roof, was granted Grade II listed status, offering protection from unauthorised alteration or demolition, in 1990. The largely intact 1930s interior has six public rooms. Other notable architectural features include a terrazzo-tiled corridor floor, moulded ceiling, original 1930s urinals and the serving hatch through which people in the two rear rooms are served beer from the front bar.

As well as serving real ale, it is known for offering over 360 whiskies.

For many years, the pub was operated as a Tetley house,  then by Punch Taverns, before being taken over in 2014 by an independent operator and refurbished. The pub was voted Best Pub in Manchester in the Pride of Manchester Awards in both 2008-2009 and 2009-2010. It is on the Campaign for Real Ale's National Inventory of Historic Pub Interiors.

See also

Listed buildings in Manchester-M1

References 

Pubs in Manchester
1800s establishments in England
Grade II listed pubs in Greater Manchester
Grade II listed buildings in Manchester